The Lehnar submachine gun (Spanish: Subametralladora Lehnar) is a submachine gun of Argentine origin. Dating to 1930, it is the first indigenously designed weapon of its type.

Overview
The Lehnar submachine gun was developed by Juan Lehnar in Argentina. It was a selective-fire weapon that fired 9mm Parabellum rounds fed by a curved magazine inserted on the left side of the receiver. Its features included a magazine that could be turned upwards to make it more compact for transport and an underfolding stock that reduced the length from 700mm/27.5″ to 290mm/11.75″. The wood foregrip could also be made to lie flat under the forward end of the receiver. Only a single prototype was built.

References

9mm Parabellum submachine guns
Submachine guns of Argentina